The Kharkiv Operation (June 1919) was a military campaign of the Russian Civil War in June 1919, in which White forces captured the important industrial center of Kharkiv from the Bolsheviks, in preparation for an advance on Moscow.

The Battle 
After months of heavy fighting in the Donbass and Don region, the Red Southern Front collapsed, allowing the Volunteer Army to launch a major attack towards the North and West. In June, the Whites undertook a successful offensive in the directions of Yekaterinoslav and Kharkiv.

By the second half of June 1919, the main forces of the Volunteer Army (most of the forces of the 1st Army and 3rd Kuban Cavalry Corps, in total 6 infantry and cavalry divisions) under the command of General Vladimir May-Mayevsky approached Kharkiv still controlled by the Red Army, and began to prepare for the assault. The main offensive on the city was developed by forces of the 1st Army Corps of General Alexander Kutepov from the south and south-east.
The city was taken after 5 days of heavy fighting.

Results 

As a result of the capture of Kharkiv, the Volunteer Army destroyed an important stronghold of the Red Army on its way to Kursk and Moscow. They also captured an important stock of weapons: armored cars, armored trains, machine guns and ammunition, and seized an important industrial center.
Thus, the AFSR were able to control a strategically important city, while also replenishing its resources and gaining the use of Kharkiv's industrial potential. 

On July 3, Anton Denikin promulgated his Moscow Directive, marking the start of the campaign against Moscow.

Battles of the Russian Civil War
History of Kharkiv
Conflicts in 1919